Nankin is an unincorporated community in Brooks County, in the U.S. state of Georgia.

History
A post office called Nankin was established in 1856, and remained in operation until 1907. The community was named after Nankin, in China.

References

Unincorporated communities in Brooks County, Georgia